General elections were held in Romania in December 1928. Immediately after acceding to power, the National Peasants' Party (NPP) prepared the next elections. The lists were filed before the local Courts before 26 November, while voting took place for the Chamber on 12 December, the Universal College of the Senate on 15 December, the local/county councils (Senate) on 17 December, and the Chamber of Industries and Commerce (Senate) on 19 December.

The elections were strongly contested by the National Liberal Party (NLP). The liberal papers ran articles like "Organised gangs led by those that are supposed to 'organise' the elections, attack people both in towns as in the country, without any fear of authority, on the contrary...". On the other hand, the NPP press claimed that "Such elections have not yet been organised in our country. For the first time ever we can see with our own eyes truly free elections. Not a single quarrel, not a single pressure, not a single involvement of the law enforcing officers."

The truth was somewhere in the middle. The Liberals were right in that the NPP misused the national budget to sponsor their own electoral campaign, as well as they abusively closed many local and county Councils (for instance, the decision of closing 23 local councils in a single county, Vlașca, was invalidated at the appeal, yet the elections have not been rerun). On the other hand, the NPP also had their own piece of truth, in that liberty and peace was granted more than ever before in election times (the reputed historian Nicolae Iorga wrote in his journal, later to be published under the title of Memorii, for the date of 12 December a very short but relevant note: "Lifeless elections"; a similar note under the date of 15: "Dead calm elections for the Senate."), although there have been quite a few scandals, in particular during the campaign.

Results

Chamber of Deputies
Of the 348 Chamber seats won by the National Peasants' Party list, the National Peasants' Party took 326, the Social Democratic Party nine, the German Party eight, the Hungarian People's Party two, while three were given to Jewish candidates. The Social Democratic Party allocated its nine seats to: Ioan Flueraș, Iosif Jumanca, Romulus Dan, Eftimie Gherman, Lothar Rădăceanu, Ion Mirescu, Alexandru Lucian, I. Rusnac and Iacob Pistiner.

Senate

Notes

References

Parliamentary elections in Romania
Romania
Romania
General